The Stade Georges-Carcassonne is a multi-purpose stadium located Aix-en-Provence, France.

Its field is natural grass, and the capacity is up to 3,700 spectators. It hosts the matches of local football team Pays d'Aix and its reserve team. It is also the stadium where the Aix-en-Provence Argonautes (American Football) team plays. It was inaugurated in 1953.

Gallery

References  

Football venues in France
Athletics (track and field) venues in France
Sports venues completed in 1953
Pays d'Aix FC
Sports venues in Bouches-du-Rhône
Buildings and structures in Aix-en-Provence